Carnivores is a series of hunting simulation video games featuring prehistoric species ranging from dinosaurs to extinct megafauna. The first three games – Carnivores (1998), Carnivores 2 (1999), and Carnivores: Ice Age (2001) – were developed for the PC by Action Forms and published by WizardWorks. The fourth game, Carnivores: Cityscape, was developed by Sunstorm Interactive and released by Infogrames in 2002.

Carnivores: Dinosaur Hunter, the fifth installment, was released for iOS, Android, PlayStation 3 (PS3), and PlayStation Portable (PSP) in 2010. Beatshapers developed the PS3 and PSP version, and Tatem Games developed the other versions. Carnivores: Ice Age was ported to iOS and Android in 2011. September 2013 marked the release of Carnivores: Dinosaur Hunter HD for the PS3. Two years later, Carnivores: Dinosaur Hunter Reborn was released for the PC. The latest game, Carnivores: Dinosaur Hunt, was released on June 1, 2021.



Games

See also

 Deer Hunter, another hunting series published by WizardWorks
 Chasm: The Rift, Action Forms' original first person shooter game.

References

External links
 

Atari games
Dinosaurs in video games
First-person shooters
Hunting video games
Dinosaur hunting
Video game franchises
Windows games
Video game franchises introduced in 1998